Schönfeldspitze is, with an elevation of , the second highest mountain (after Selbhorn) in the Steinernes Meer, a sub-range of the Berchtesgaden Alps. It is located in the Austrian state of Salzburg, close to the German border.

Schönfeldspitze has a quite uncommon summit cross showing Virgin Mary cradling the dead body of Jesus (a Pietà).

References 

Mountains of Salzburg (state)
Two-thousanders of Austria
Mountains of the Alps
Berchtesgaden Alps